Andrzej Stanisław Zoll (born 27 May 1942) is a Polish lawyer, former judge and president of the Polish Constitutional Tribunal, former Polish Ombudsman, former president of the State Electoral Commission, former president of the Legislative Council, co-author of the Polish Penal Code of 1997. Professor of criminal law at the Jagiellonian University.

Biography
Andrzej Zoll was born in Sieniawa, Poland. He graduated from the Faculty of Law of the Jagiellonian University in 1964. He earned his Ph.D. in 1968, and a habilitated doctor's title in 1973. In 1988 he became professor of legal sciences. Since 1994 he heads the Chair of Criminal Law of the Jagiellonian University.

In 1989 he took part in the Round Table Negotiations as Solidarity’s legal expert.

Member of the Polish Academy of Sciences and the European Art and Science Academy in Salzburg. Between 1989-1993, he served as a judge of the Polish Constitutional Tribunal and between 1990-1993 he was chairman of the State Electoral Committee. In 2002, he was appointed deputy director at the European Ombudsman Institute. Since 2000 until 2006, he served as Polish Ombudsman for Citizens' Rights.

Author of 3 monographs and above 150 other publications in the area of criminal and constitutional law and philosophy of law.

Member of the Committee on Ethics of the Polish Academy of Sciences, as well as Department of History and Philosophy of the Polish Academy of Learning. Curator of the Association of Law Students' Library of the Jagiellonian University.

Distinctions
 Commander's Cross of the Polonia Restituta
 Great Cross with Star of the Order of Merit of the Federal Republic of Germany
 Grand Decoration of Honour in Gold with Sash for Services to the Republic of Austria (1997) 
 Order of the Lithuanian Grand Duke Gediminas (Lithuania)
 Doctor honoris causa of the universities of Vilnius and Mainz

See also
Politics of Poland

References

External links
 Biography at the website of the Polish Constitutional Tribunal
 List of publications at the website of the Chair of Criminal Law of the Jagiellonian University

1942 births
Constitutional court judges
Lawyers from Kraków
Jagiellonian University alumni
Academic staff of Jagiellonian University
Commanders of the Order of Polonia Restituta
Knights Commander of the Order of Merit of the Federal Republic of Germany
Ombudsmen in Poland
Recipients of the Grand Decoration with Sash for Services to the Republic of Austria
Recipients of the Order of the Lithuanian Grand Duke Gediminas
20th-century Polish judges
Living people
Members of the European Academy of Sciences and Arts